Yakoma may refer to: 
 Yakoma people, an ethnic group mainly living in the Central African Republic
 Yakoma language, spoken by the Yakoma people and others
 Yakoma, Democratic Republic of the Congo, a town in the Democratic Republic of the Congo
 Yakoma Territory, a territory of the Democratic Republic of the Congo